Classic Hits Radio is a 24-hour Classic Hits radio network. Classic Hits Radio is heard in over 100 markets around the U.S. Classic Hits Radio, formerly known as "Pure Gold" and "Oldies Radio", plays a selection of well-tested pop and rock hits from the late 1960s, 1970s and 1980s. "Classic Hits Radio" is one of two satellite oldies formats offered by Cumulus Media Networks, the other being Scott Shannon's "The True Oldies Channel," which is automated and voice-tracked entirely by Shannon and features an older playlist of music.

Nationally recognized DJs include Maria Danza, Steve Gunn, Smokin'Kevan Browning, Randy Fuller, Dwayne Dancer, "Late Night" Larry King (unrelated to the talk show host), and, before his death, Dave Michaels. As of September 16, 2011, it is distributed by Cumulus Media Networks and is one of the original Satellite Music Network stations.

Classic Hits repeating features include "Instant Winner Thursday", "The Top 5 Countdown", and themed weekends every weekend.

In November and December 2010, Classic Hits shared its channel space with its sister network The Christmas Channel from the day before Thanksgiving Day through Christmas Day.

Cumulus purchased Dial Global/Westwood One in 2013. In July 2014 "Cumulus Classic Hits", formerly "Pure Gold", merged with Dial Global/Westwood One Classic Hits, as did most formats that were duplicated between the two syndicators. Most Cumulus Classic Hits personalities were displaced. Dewayne Dancer remained as part of the "new" "Classic Hits", but in an overnight role. Maria Danza and Smokin Kevan Browning segued to the new "Good Time Oldies Format", Cumulus replacement for Scott Shannon's cancelled "True Oldies" format. Danza later returned to Classic Hits on a weekend evening shift. Steve Gunn and Larry King departed the company, while Randy Fuller and Barbara Summers remain as weekend hosts.

GTO is the first joint programming effort at the network level between Cumulus and Westwood One, debuting in 75 U.S. markets, including Tampa Bay, Florida; Phoenix, Arizona; and Atlanta, Georgia.

A spin-off format, dubbed "Classic Hits / Rock" by Westwood One, features an anti-disco presentation with no music associated with black artists. In October 2019, Classic Hits was announced to be reformatted as an all 80s music format, with a third version of the format, "Classic Hits Gold," reincorporating more 1960s music into its 1970s/early 1980s core mix.

Sample hour of programming

Classic Hits
"Live and Let Die" - Wings
"Crazy Little Thing Called Love" - Queen
"Do Wah Diddy Diddy" - Manfred Mann
"Rockin' Me" - Steve Miller Band
"Superstition" - Stevie Wonder
"Sara Smile" - Hall & Oates
"No Time" - The Guess Who
"Do Ya Think I'm Sexy?" - Rod Stewart
"Have You Ever Seen the Rain" - Creedance Clearwater Revival
"China Grove" - The Doobie Brothers
"Uptown Girl" - Billy Joel

Classic Hits - Rock
"Sweet Home Alabama" - Lynyrd Skynyrd
"Bennie and the Jets" - Elton John
"Mony Mony" - Billy Idol
"Old Time Rock and Roll" - Bob Seger
"Go Your Own Way" - Fleetwood Mac
"Whole Lotta Love" - Led Zeppelin
"One of These Nights" - Eagles
"I Love Rock 'n' Roll" - Joan Jett & the Blackhearts
"Hold the Line" - Toto
"Come Together" - The Beatles
"25 or 6 to 4" - Chicago
"Livin' on a Prayer" - Bon Jovi
"Feels Like the First Time" - Foreigner
"Couldn't Get It Right" - Climax Blues Band

American radio networks
Classic hits radio stations in the United States
Westwood One
Former subsidiaries of The Walt Disney Company